Yanaccacca (possibly from Quechua yana black, qaqa rock, "black rock") may refer to:

 Yanaccacca (Ancash), a mountain in Ancash, Peru
 Yanaccacca (Moquegua), a mountain in Moquegua, Peru